Joshua Alexander Reaves (born June 4, 1997) is a Bolivian-American professional basketball player for the Rio Grande Valley Vipers of the NBA G League. He played college basketball at Penn State.

Early life and high school
Reaves was born and grew up in Fairfax, Virginia. He and his older brother were raised in a single parent household by his Bolivian-born mother, Liset Bravo Reaves, after his father died when he was six years old. He initially attended Middleburg Academy with Mo Alie-Cox, later transferring to Paul VI Catholic High School, where he played both basketball and soccer. As a junior, Reaves was named team captain and averaged 12.6 points per game and was named All-Washington Metro Area as the Panthers won the Washington Catholic Athletic Conference, VISAA Division I State championship, and the Alhambra Catholic Invitational. Reaves transferred to Oak Hill Academy before his senior year. Ranked the 74th-best recruit in the nation and second in state by ESPN.com, Reaves committed to play college basketball at Penn State over offers from Temple, Villanova, Maryland, VCU and Georgetown. He was named Oak Hill's captain as the team went 47–1 and was ranked seventh nationally by MaxPreps in his only season.

College career
Reaves played four seasons as a member of the Penn State Nittany Lions. He started 20 games as a freshman and appeared in six more off the bench, despite missing time due to a bout with Mononucleosis, averaging 6.4 points, 3.6 rebounds, 1.3 steals and 0.9 blocks. As a sophomore, Reaves averaged 7.7 points and four rebounds per game while leading the Big Ten with 2.14 steals per game (16th-best in the nation). In his junior season, Reaves averaged 10.6 points, 5.1 reboundsand 3.2 assists per game and again led the Big Ten with 2.18 steals per game and was named to the Big Ten All-Defensive Team. He was named the Big Ten Defensive Player of the Year, All-Defensive Team, and honorable mention all-conference as a senior after averaging 10.6 points, five rebounds, 2.9 assists and 1.0 blocks per game and leading the Big Ten for the third straight season with 2.5 steals per game. Reaves finished his collegiate career with 1,079 career points, 540 rebounds, 310 assists and 92 shots blocked and set the school record with 250 steals. Following the end of his senior season, Reaves was invited to play in the Portsmouth Invitational Tournament, where he was named to the All-Tournament team.

Professional career

Dallas Mavericks (2019–2020) 
After going unselected in the 2019 NBA draft, Reaves was named to the Dallas Mavericks Summer League roster and averaged 12.6 points, 4.8 rebounds, 2.4 assists, 1.2 steals and one block per game over five games. Reaves signed a two-way contract with the Mavericks on July 29, 2019. Reaves made his NBA debut on January 2, 2020, playing the final minute of the 123–111 win against the Brooklyn Nets. On August 10, in a 122–114 victory against the Utah Jazz, Reaves made his first career field goal scoring a layup on a backdoor cut, and also had his first career rebound and assist; he finished the game with 4 points on 2 of 4 shooting from the field, 1 rebound, and 3 assists in 14 minutes of playing time.

Rio Grande Valley Vipers (2021) 
On December 19, 2020, Reaves signed with the Houston Rockets, but was waived on the same day and on January 18, 2021, he signed with the Rio Grande Valley Vipers.

Beşiktaş (2021–2022) 
On July 5, 2021, Reaves signed with Beşiktaş Icrypex of the Basketbol Süper Ligi (BSL).

Tofaş (2022) 
On September 13, 2022, Reaves signed with Tofaş of the Basketbol Süper Ligi (BSL).

Return to Rio Grande (2022–present)
On November 3, 2022, Reaves was named to the opening night roster for the Rio Grande Valley Vipers.

Bolivia national team
Reaves plays for the Bolivian national team where he has been the key player.

At the 2023 FIBA Basketball World Cup qualification (Americas), he led Bolivia in points, assists, steals and blocks.

Career statistics

NBA

Regular season

|-
| style="text-align:left;"| 
| style="text-align:left;"| Dallas
| 4 || 0 || 7.0 || .333 || .000 ||  1.000 || .8 || .8 || 0 || 0 || 2.0
|- class="sortbottom"
| style="text-align:center;" colspan="2"| Career
| 4 || 0 || 7.0 || .333 || .000 ||  1.000 || .8 || .8 || 0 || 0 || 2.0

Playoffs

|-
| style="text-align:left;"| 2020
| style="text-align:left;"| Dallas
| 2 || 0 || 4.5 || .333 || .000 || 1.000 || 1.0 || .5 || .0 || .5 || 2.0
|- class="sortbottom"
| style="text-align:center;" colspan="2"| Career
| 2 || 0 || 4.5 || .333 || .000 || 1.000 || 1.0 || .5 || .0 || .5 || 2.0

College statistics

|-
| style="text-align:left;"| 2015–16
| style="text-align:left;"| Penn State
| 27|| 20 || 23.0 || .375 || .077 || .756 || 3.6 || 1.9 || 1.3 || .9 || 6.1
|-
| style="text-align:left;"| 2016–17
| style="text-align:left;"| Penn State
| 28 || 23 || 27.1 || .448 || .322 || .708 || 4.0 || 2.1 || 2.1 || .8 || 7.7
|-
| style="text-align:left;"| 2017–18
| style="text-align:left;"| Penn State
| 34 || 32 ||  30.8 || .487|| .377 || .707 || 5.1 || 3.1 || 2.2 || .5 || 10.6
|-
| style="text-align:left;"| 2018–19
| style="text-align:left;"| Penn State
| 32 || 32 || 33.0 || .426|| .356 || .656 || 5.0 || 2.9 || 2.5|| 1.0 || 10.6
|- class="sortbottom"
| style="text-align:center;" colspan="2"| Career
| 121|| 107 || 28.8 || .438 || .324 || .702 || 4.5 || 2.6 || 2.1 || .8 || 8.9

Personal
Reaves has dual American and Bolivian citizenship due to his mother being from Bolivia. His uncle played soccer professionally. He is the first Bolivian to play in the NBA. His older brother, Michael, played college football at Shepherd University.

References

External links

Penn State Nittany Lions bio

1997 births
Living people
21st-century African-American sportspeople
African-American basketball players
American men's basketball players
American people of Bolivian descent
People with acquired Bolivian citizenship
Basketball players from Virginia
Beşiktaş men's basketball players
Bolivian men's basketball players
Bolivian people of American descent
People of African-American descent
Dallas Mavericks players
Penn State Nittany Lions basketball players
Rio Grande Valley Vipers players
Shooting guards
Sportspeople from Fairfax, Virginia
Texas Legends players
Tofaş S.K. players
Undrafted National Basketball Association players